Te Acordarás de Mí ("You Will Remember Me") is the title of a studio album released by singer Olga Tañón on October 27, 1998. This album became her second number-one album on the Billboard Top Latin Albums.

The song "Voy A Sacarte De Mi Mente" is a Spanish-language version of Go West's hit song "King of Wishful Thinking".

Track listing
The information from Billboard.

Chart performance

Sales and certifications

See also
 List of number-one Billboard Top Latin Albums from the 1990s
 List of number-one Billboard Latin Pop Albums from the 1990s

References

1998 albums
Olga Tañón albums
Spanish-language albums
Warner Music Latina albums
Albums produced by Rudy Pérez